Denis Nikolayevich Dereshev (born 10 August 1978) is a former Russian football player.

Honours
Regar-TadAZ Tursunzoda
Tajik League champion: 2004

References

1978 births
Living people
Russian footballers
FC Lokomotiv Nizhny Novgorod players
Russian Premier League players
Russian expatriate footballers
Expatriate footballers in Tajikistan
Russian expatriate sportspeople in Tajikistan
Association football midfielders
FC Khimik Dzerzhinsk players
Tajikistan Higher League players